Sukhvor-e Rashid-e Sofla (also Romanized as Sūkhvor-e Rashīd-e Soflá, Sūkhvor Rashīd-e Soflá, and Sūkhūr-e Rashīd-e Soflá) is a village in Heydariyeh Rural District, Govar District, Gilan-e Gharb County, Kermanshah Province, Iran. At the 2006 census, its population was 196, in 42 families.

References 

Populated places in Gilan-e Gharb County